Kit Guard (born Christen Klitgaard May 5, 1894 - July 18, 1961) was a Danish-American actor whose career started in the 1920s. 

Guard left his birthplace of Hals, Denmark, around the turn of the 20th century, one of five brothers to do so. He moved to San Francisco, and in 1913 he became assistant stage manager and actor at the Alcazar Theatre there. He later acted on stage at the Wigwam Theatre in San Francisco. In World War I, he entertained overseas and later served in the Rainbow Division of the U. S. Army.

Guard was a prolific performer, appearing in over 400 films. He appeared with Al Cooke as a comic duo in a number of films from 1923 to 1927. His other film appearances range from The Racketeer in 1929 to The Joker Is Wild in 1957, with a number of subsequent uncredited appearances.

Guard died of cancer at the Motion Picture Country House and Hospital in Woodland Hills on July 18, 1961, aged 67.

Selected filmography
 The Patent Leather Pug (1925)
 Two Fisted Justice (1931)
 The Final Edition (1932)
 The Last Man (1932)
 Her Forgotten Past (1933)
 Before Midnight (1933)
 Rip Roaring Riley (1935)
 Paroled from the Big House (1938)
 Frontiers of '49 (1939)

References

External links 
 
 
 

1894 births
1961 deaths
Danish emigrants to the United States
20th-century American male actors
American male film actors
American male stage actors